Lagwagon is an American punk rock band originally from Goleta, California, just outside Santa Barbara. They formed in 1989, went on hiatus in 2000, and reunited several times over the years. Their name comes from the band's tour van, which can be seen on the back cover of their 1994 second album Trashed.

The band has 12 releases through Fat Wreck Chords: nine studio albums, one EP, one live album and a collection of B-sides, compilation tracks and demos. Lagwagon has never had, nor have they seemed to pursue, strong mainstream success, but they do have a devoted underground following in North America, Europe and Asia. Their moderate success reflected a growing interest in punk rock during the 1990s, along with fellow California bands Rancid, Green Day and The Offspring. Their song "May 16" was also featured in Tony Hawk's Pro Skater 2.

History 

Lagwagon originally started under the name Section 8 but were dissatisfied with the name because multiple other bands were already using it. According to the liner notes of the re-release of Duh, it was Fat Mike's idea to switch to Lagwagon based on the already written song of the same name about the band's unreliable touring van.  After signing to Fat Mike's label Fat Wreck Chords, Lagwagon released their debut album for the label, Duh, in 1992. Frontman Joey Cape commented on how the album was made, "Back then, we were inexperienced in the studio. It was less about the recording process and more about rehearsing. We recorded and mixed Duh in 4 days. There's something to be said for a budget. You have to have your shit together before you go into the studio and the end result is a record that better reflects the band's sound at the time." Two years later, Lagwagon released Trashed, their second record on Fat, which turned out to be highly successful, leading to the eventual production of a video for "Island of Shame." During this time, a number of punk bands, such as Green Day, The Offspring and Rancid, had hit the mainstream and Lagwagon turned down offers to join several major labels. Hoss, the third Lagwagon album, was released on November 21, 1995. After the release of that album and an extensive tour in Europe, Australia, and Japan, both guitarist Shawn Dewey and drummer Derrick Plourde would leave the band and be replaced temporarily by Kenneth Stringfellow (The Posies) on guitar, and permanently by Dave Raun (RKL) on drums. Shawn Dewey, already in the side project band Buck Wild on Lobster Records would go on to release two full-length LPs, Beat Me Silly and Full Metal Overdrive, and do two European tours with Good Riddance and Ten Foot Pole.

After two more albums, Double Plaidinum and Let's Talk About Feelings, the band went on indefinite hiatus in 2000, due to all members working on side projects. Lagwagon resurfaced in 2002, and released their sixth album Blaze the following year. In 2004, frontman Joey Cape released a split album with No Use for a Name vocalist Tony Sly featuring acoustic versions of songs by both bands. On November 1, 2005, Lagwagon released Resolve, which is a homage to the life of Derrick Plourde, original drummer for Lagwagon and Bad Astronaut.

In 2008, Lagwagon released an EP titled I Think My Older Brother Used to Listen to Lagwagon. Despite earlier reports that the band would begin recording their next full-length studio album by 2009, Lagwagon had gone on hiatus from touring and writing again, due to Cape launching a solo career, releasing Bridge in 2008 and Doesn't Play Well with Others in 2010.

In January 2010, Joey Cape announced during an interview with Canada's Exclaim! magazine that Jesse Buglione had left Lagwagon, having been with the band since its foundation in 1990. However, Cape dismissed rumors of Lagwagon breaking up. While he was not sure if Lagwagon would record a new album or embark on another full-scale tour, he said that he was open to playing shows and possibly recording and releasing new Lagwagon songs sporadically. Jesse Buglione confirmed his departure on Lagwagon's official message board himself, as reported by sputnikmusic.com and punknews.org. Lagwagon toured with No Use for a Name that summer. In an interview with fasterlouder.com.au Joey Cape, revealed former RKL bassist Joe Raposo is Lagwagon's new bassist. In a June 2011 interview with ExploreMusic however, Joey Cape said that things didn't work out with Raposo, and the band is testing a new bassist. After first announcing Patrick Solem as the new bass player in August 2011, the band decided that Raposo would remain in the band permanently.

On September 22, 2011, Fat Wreck announced they would be re-issuing expanded editions of the first five albums on CD, vinyl, and digital download. The albums were available both separately and in a box set titled Putting Music In Its Place. The reissues were released November 22, 2011, with a short line-up of concerts in the U.S. played in December and January, and a European tour following in April 2012. As of October 2012, Lagwagon is headlining a full U.S. tour titled The Fat Tour 2012, with Dead To Me, The Flatliners, and Useless ID as support.

In October 2012, Joey Cape stated that there will be a new Lagwagon album, which will be their first since 2005's Resolve. While details and release dates are not yet known, the band announced on its Twitter feed that songs are being written for a new album.  The September 22 Tweet reads, "Writing, writing, writing. New album... It's gonna happen!" 

The band recorded their eighth album, Hang, with Bill Stevenson and Jason Livermore at The Blasting Room, Ft Collins, CO. The album was released on October 28, 2014, and debuted at #95 on the Billboard 200.

On October 4, 2019, the band released their ninth studio album Railer, with the lead single being "Bubble". To support the new release, a tour was announced with Face to Face as a co-headlining event.

Current members 
Joey Cape – vocals (1990–present)
Chris Flippin – guitar (1990–present)
Dave Raun – drums (1996–present)
Chris Rest – guitar (1997–present)
Joe Raposo – bass (2010–present)

Former members 
Shawn Dewey – guitar (1990–1996)
Ken Stringfellow – guitar (1996–1997)
Jesse Buglione – bass (1990–2010)
Derrick Plourde – drums (1990–1996; died 2005)

Touring members 
Lindsay McDougall – guitar (2008)
Scott Shiflett – guitar (2008)
Chris Shiflett – guitar (1996)

Timeline

Discography

Studio albums

EPs

Box sets

Other releases

Singles and music videos 
 "Island of Shame" from Trashed
 "Razor Burn" from Hoss
 "Falling Apart" from Blaze
 "Heartbreaking Music" from Resolve
 "Made of Broken Parts" from Hang
"Bubble" from Railer
"Surviving California" from Railer
"Stealing Light" from Railer

Compilations 
 "Noble End" on Can of Pork
 "Know-It-All" and "Mr. Coffee" on Fat Music For Fat People
 "Sleep" and "Laymen's Terms" on Survival of the Fattest
 "Raise a Family" on Physical Fatness
 "May 16" on Life in the Fat Lane
 "Alison's Disease" on Live Fat, Die Young
 "Never Stops" on Uncontrollable Fatulence
 "Randal Gets Drunk" on Short Music for Short People
 "Failure" on A Compilation of Warped Music from Double Plaidinum
 "Dinner and a Movie" on Warped Tour 2002 Tour Compilation from Blaze
 "Falling Apart" on Warped Tour 2003 Tour Compilation from Blaze
 "S.O.S. (One Man Army)" on Let Them Know: The Story of Youth Brigade and BYO Records
 "Status Pools" on Rock Against Bush, Vol. 2
 "Violins" on Wrecktrospective from Hoss
 "Discomfort Inn (Tony Sly)" on The Songs of Tony Sly: A Tribute
 "A Feedbag of Truckstop Poetry" on Playing 4 Square

References

External links 

 Official website
 

Fat Wreck Chords artists
Punk rock groups from California
Musical groups established in 1990
Skate punk groups